Skin disinfection is a process that involves the application of a disinfectant to reduce levels of microorganisms on the skin. Disinfecting both the skin of the patient and the hands of the healthcare providers are an important part of surgery.

Skin disinfection may be accomplished with a number of solutions including providone-iodine, chlorhexidine, alcohol based solutions, and cetrimide. There is strong evidence that chlorhexidine and denatured alcohol use to clean skin prior to surgery is better than any other commercially available antiseptic, such as povidone-iodine with alcohol.

Its importance in health care was determined by Semmelweis in the 1840s.

References

Skin care